Csehimindszent (formerly Csehi-Mindszent) is a village in Vas County, Western Hungary.

Famous people 
 József Mindszenty (Pehm) was born in Csehimindszent in 1892.

Nearby municipalities 
 Csehi
 Olaszfa
 Csipkerek, Potypuszta
 Mikosdpuszta, Mikosdszéplak
 Vasvár

External links 
 Street map 

Populated places in Vas County